Dana Terrace (born December 8, 1990) is an American animator, writer, storyboard artist, director, producer and voice actress. She is best known as the creator of the Disney Channel animated series The Owl House. She is also known for storyboarding on Gravity Falls and directing on the 2017 reboot of DuckTales.

Early life and education 
Terrace was born in Hamden, Connecticut. She spent eight years going to St. Rita School, a local Catholic School, gaining an interest in painters such as John Bauer, Remedios Varo, and Hieronymus Bosch. As a child, she watched cartoons like The Powerpuff Girls, South Park, and The Simpsons, inspiring her later works. Studio Ghibli films (especially Princess Mononoke), the anime series Revolutionary Girl Utena and Garfield influenced her as well. In 2000, she created her first flip-book animation, which focused on "Pikachu thundershocking a Charmander." Terrace was a dancer for 10 years. She attended Cooperative Arts and Humanities High School in New Haven, Connecticut.

Terrace studied animation at the School of Visual Arts in New York. While there she drew for about eight hours a day, and began posting work to her Tumblr blog. In April 2012, during her third year at SVA, she created an animated short titled "Kickball," with voiceovers by Yotem Perel and music by Jeff Liu. "Kickball" was praised for its design and "expressive motion" and won a grant from the National Board of Review. The following year, she worked with Iker Maidagan on a short animated film titled "Mirage". Maidagan did the layout and wrote the story, while Terrace animated and designed the characters. The film was praised as being "flawlessly executed," was shown at the LA Shorts Fest, and resulted in Terrace and Maidagan receiving an Alumni Scholarship Award. At the time, when asked about animating, she said she loved it, and said she is on the track to become a "proper filmmaker" and stated that she would collaborate with Maidagan in the future. She later described her experience at SVA as a mixed bag, although she learned a lot from online tutorials, her peers, and fellow students.

In 2011, Terrace was an assistant for a thesis horror comedy film by Zach Bellissimo titled Blanderstein, as was Terrace's roommate Luz Batista. Blanderstein went on to win a Dusty Award for "Outstanding Traditional Animation and Achievement in Traditional Animation Character Design," tying with Michael Ruocco's thesis film, Destiny is for the Birds.

Internship and early work 
After graduating from SVA in 2013, she interned the following summer at JibJab, where she met an individual from Gravity Falls who saw her student film Mirage and sent her a storyboard test, subsequently landing her a job on the series as a storyboard revisionist. As she described it in 2017, she was brought into Gravity Falls because creative people working on the show liked what they saw on her Tumblr blog, and she was brought in because she was willing to do any kind of animation for a specific scene. Her work for Gravity Falls would be her "first professional animation job," where she learned to storyboard, how to handle a crew, and have a clear vision. Terrace also animated sequences for the show that were animated in-house due to being considered too important to be animated by outside studios. In 2019, she said she had a "wonderful experience" on Gravity Falls and said she "couldn’t have asked for a better first gig." She stated in a 2016 interview that she was waiting to hear back from Steven Universe because she was a fan of Rebecca Sugar after seeing her films at SVA, but they "took too long to reply" so she decided to work for Gravity Falls instead.

In 2014, she tabled at the CTN Animation Expo with Nate Swineheart, and sold prints, sketchbooks, and other works. In 2018, she inked 34 pages of Hirsch's graphic novel, Gravity Falls: Lost Legends: 4 All-New Adventures!

Career 
In 2017, Terrace directed various episodes of DuckTales and made the character Webby Vanderquack "more dynamic."
Terrace later said she wasn't feeling "fulfilled artistically or emotionally" in the job, which moved her to create her own series. Although she had never watched the series before working on the show, the line producer for the second season of Gravity Falls was also working on DuckTales and brought her into the show. The same year, Variety highlighted her as an up-and-coming animator. Also that year she worked as a storyboard revisionist for Tangled: Before Ever After, directed by Tom Caulfield and Stephen Sandoval; Sandoval would later work on The Owl House. She later storyboarded the fourth episode of Rapunzel's Tangled Adventure, "Challenge of the Brave."

After years of working on other Disney Channel shows, Terrace developed the characters and "baseline idea" for an original series at the end of 2016 and pitched the series a few months after she started directing DuckTales in 2017. The pitch, "a young girl goes to another world and learns magic from an older witch", later developed into The Owl House. The first character she created was the Owl Lady, which she based on the women in her family, including her aunts, mother, and grandmother. The character Luz Noceda is named after her roommate. The series was also influenced by Pokémon Red, a game Terrace's father, Thomas Terrace, an attorney in Hamden, Connecticut, gave her before he died in a car accident when she was age 11.  Terrace said she was motivated to create The Owl House to prove it was a good story, and gave it the current name because of the "mystique surrounding owls." She later said that while there is some information for fans who want to "dig deeper" into the show, like codes and ciphers in Gravity Falls, there is a way to "enjoy the show as it is" without digging into the show's lore.

The Owl House began development on February 23, 2018, when it was greenlit alongside Amphibia, and premiered on January 10, 2020, on Disney Channel in the United States. The series was approved for a second season on November 21, 2019. The same year, Terrace illustrated an alternative cover for issue 4 of Adventure Time with Fionna and Cake: Card Wars, a BOOM! Studios six-issue miniseries which featured Fionna and Cake, the gender-swapped versions of Finn and Jake. Terrace also provided guest animation for the episode of Adventure Time titled "Bad Timing". A few years later, Terrace criticized the cancellation of The Venture Bros. by Adult Swim, writing "this timeline sucks."

In 2021, the director of The Mitchells vs. the Machines Mike Rianda would reveal that Terrace had been a storyboard artist for the film. The same year, Terrace provided rough animation for The Owl House season 2 episodes "Keeping Up A-fear-ances", "Hunting Palismen", and "Eclipse Lake".

Terrace and LGBTQ+ representation in The Owl House

The Owl House has been praised for its depiction of an LGBTQ+ relationship between the characters of Luz Noceda and Amity Blight, for which Terrace is responsible. During its second season, the series was also lauded for the inclusion of a non-binary and presumably transgender character, in the form of Raine Whispers. She actively uses Twitter to confirm the LGBTQ+ identities of characters. Though Disney was initially resistant to the portrayal of a queer relationship on the show, Terrace eventually gained their support, crediting the change of mind to her "stubbornness".

Terrace told Vanity Fair in March 2021 that she was open about plans for Luz being bisexual and including LGBT+ characters during development of the show. She was later told that she could not "have any kind of gay storyline among the main characters." Terrace said that, in response, "I let myself get mad, to absolutely blow up, and storm out of the room. Life is short and I don't have time for cowardice, I was ready to move on to greener pastures if need be." A "week or two" later, she was "given the all-clear" and describes the studio as supportive since then.

News media such as CNN and Deadline have expressed support for these portrayals, while conservative sites like One Million Moms have expressed the opposite, condemning Disney Channel for their inclusion of LGBTQ+ identities in the series.

In 2023, Dana announced on her Instagram that she would be leaving Disney.

Personal life 
Terrace came out as bisexual in 2017, and drew on her experiences to create The Owl House and the bisexual character Luz Noceda. Terrace has mentioned multiple times that she draws inspiration for Luz Noceda from herself.

From 2015 to sometime before April 2022, Terrace was in a relationship with Gravity Falls creator Alex Hirsch.

Terrace is a member of the Democratic Party, and is a supporter of abortion rights, same-sex marriage, immigration, and healthcare for transgender Americans. She is known to be vocal about her political views on social media, and has often condemned policies passed by Republican politicians.

In 2018, Terrace signed a petition supporting pay equity in the animation industry. In 2022, she joined other animators at Disney who criticized Bob Chapek's refusal to make a comment on HB 1557, which is often referred to as the "Don't Say Gay" bill. She also argued that Chapek's letter to employees was "flowery and compassionate words to shut you up."

Filmography

Film

Television

Nominations and awards 

|-
! scope="row" style="text-align:center;" | 2018
| Daytime Emmy Award
| Outstanding Special Class Animated Program
| DuckTales (for "Woo-oo!")
| 
|
|-
! scope="row" rowspan="3" style="text-align:center;" | 2021
| GLAAD Media Award
| Outstanding Kids and Family Programming
| rowspan="5"|The Owl House
| 
|
|-
| Peabody Awards
| Children's & Youth Programming
| 
|
|-
| Daytime Emmys
| Outstanding Main Title for a Daytime Animated Program
| 
|
|-
! scope="row" style="text-align:center;"| 2022
| GLAAD Media Award
| Outstanding Kids and Family Programming
| 
| 
|-
! scope="row" style="text-align:center;"| 2023
| GLAAD Media Award
| Outstanding Kids and Family Programming - Animated
| 
| 
|}

Notes

References

External links 
 
 
 
 

1990 births
Living people
American people of Irish descent
American storyboard artists
People from Hamden, Connecticut
Connecticut Democrats
California Democrats
American feminists
School of Visual Arts alumni
Disney Television Animation people
Bisexual artists
Bisexual actresses
Bisexual feminists
Bisexual women
LGBT animators
LGBT people from Connecticut
LGBT people from California
American LGBT rights activists
21st-century American LGBT people
American bisexual actors
American LGBT artists
American LGBT screenwriters
LGBT television directors
Activists from Connecticut
Activists from California